Villagers & Heroes is a free-to-play online massively multiplayer online role-playing game (MMORPG) created by Mad Otter Games. Originally titled A Mystical Land, it was released in 2011.  As of March 2022, Mad Otter Games continues to update Villagers & Heroes for iOS, Android and Microsoft Windows.

Gameplay 
The game offers five classes: Wizard, Warrior, Hunter, Shaman and Priest, and as those classes are leveled, 'talent points' gained by leveling up can be placed into different active and passive skills. In addition, there are ten complementary gathering professions: mining, fishing, bug lore, plant lore, smithing, cooking, tailoring, woodcrafting, gardening and ranching.

References

External links 
 

2011 video games
Android (operating system) games
IOS games
Massively multiplayer online role-playing games
Video games developed in the United States
Windows games
Fantasy massively multiplayer online role-playing games
Active massively multiplayer online games
Free-to-play video games
Multiplayer online games